Ruby Blue is a 2008 British drama directed by Jan Dunn and starring Bob Hoskins and Josiane Balasko.

Plot
Jack sinks into depression following the death of his wife. The arrival of a mysterious Frenchwoman in the neighborhood will change his life. Jack will then gradually discover the truth about this enigmatic woman.

Cast

 Bob Hoskins as Jack
 Josiane Balasko as Stephanie
 Jody Latham as Ian
 Josef Altin as Frankie
 Jessica Stewart as Florrie
 Shannon Tomkinson as Stacey
 Sean Wilton as Dick
 Angelica O'Reilly as Rosie
 Ashley McGuire as Debbie
 Chloe Sirene as Cecile
 Michael Mills as Joey
 Sam Talbot as Sean
 Nicola Stewart as Sean's wife
 Corinna Powlesland as Suzy
 Joel Clark Ackerman as Tony
 Lisa Payne as The policewoman
 James O'Donnell as The policeman
 Rebecca Clow as DCI Cartwright

Production

The filming took place in Kent at Ramsgate, Deal and Barnsole Vineyard.

The movie was presented in several Film Festivals like the Dinard Festival of British Cinema (France), the Warsaw International FilmFest (Poland), the Cinequest International Film Festival (USA), the London Independent Film Festival (UK) and the Frameline Film Festival (USA).

Accolades

References

External links

2008 films
2008 drama films
British drama films
2000s English-language films
2000s British films